Edward Eugene Gainey (born June 6, 1990) is a Canadian football defensive back for the Edmonton Elks of the Canadian Football League (CFL). He played college football at Appalachian State University. He has also been a member of the Saskatchewan Roughriders, Montreal Alouettes and Hamilton Tiger-Cats of the CFL.

Early years
Gainey played high school football at Mount Tabor High School in Winston-Salem, North Carolina. He was a two-time all-region selection and Shrine Bowl participant. He intercepted six passes, forced three fumbles and was the team’s second-leading tackler his senior year as the Spartans advanced to the 4-A state championship game. Gainey led the state with 13 interceptions as a junior.

College career
Gainey played for the Appalachian State Mountaineers from 2008 to 2011. He finished his college career with 168 defensive tackles, five interceptions and 59 pass breakups. He was named second team All-Southern Conference in 2009 and 2010.

Professional career

Montreal Alouettes
Gainey signed with the Montreal Alouettes on May 3, 2012. He made his CFL debut on July 6, 2012 against the Winnipeg Blue Bombers. He signed a three-year contract with the Alouettes in January 2014. Gainey was released by the Alouettes on June 21, 2014.

Hamilton Tiger-Cats
Gainey was signed by the Hamilton Tiger-Cats on July 16, 2014.

Saskatchewan Roughriders
Gainey signed with the Saskatchewan Roughriders on February 10, 2016. On August 13, 2017, during a 41–8 home victory against the BC Lions, Gainey became the first CFL player since 1986 and ninth all-time to record four interceptions in a single game. Gainey finished the year with 10 interceptions, and was named both a CFL-West All-Star, and a CFL All-Star. Gainey's 2018 saw a dip in statistics due to fewer quarterbacks targeting him, but he still nabbed 3 interceptions as well as his first career sack, and was named to his second CFL All-Star team. Gainey set a career high for tackles in 2019, with 56 takedowns to go alongside two more interceptions. He signed a one-year contract extension with the Roughriders on January 25, 2021.

Edmonton Elks

Gainey signed with the Edmonton Elks to open free agency on February 8, 2022. In his first season in Edmonton Gainey made an instant impact after contributing with 47 defensive tackles, one interception, and two forced fumbles in 18 games in 2022. On January 19, 2023 Gainey and the Elks agree to a one-year contract extension.

References

External links
Edmonton Elks bio
Just Sports Stats
NFL Draft Scout

Living people
1990 births
Players of American football from North Carolina
American football defensive backs
Canadian football defensive backs
African-American players of American football
African-American players of Canadian football
Appalachian State Mountaineers football players
Montreal Alouettes players
Hamilton Tiger-Cats players
Saskatchewan Roughriders players
21st-century African-American sportspeople